Chaetocrepis besckii is a species of beetle in the family Carabidae, the only species in the genus Chaetocrepis.

References

Licininae
Monotypic Carabidae genera
Beetles described in 1857